Cathaica is a genus of small, air-breathing land snails, or terrestrial molluscs in the subfamily Bradybaeninae of the family Camaenidae.

Species
 Cathaica bizonalis D. Chen & G. Zhang, 2004
 Cathaica cardiostima Möllendorff, 1899
 Cathaica cavimargo (Martens, 1879)
 Cathaica chumbanensis D. Chen & G. Zhang, 2004
 Cathaica connectens Möllendorff, 1899
 Cathaica constantiae (H. Adams, 1870)
 Cathaica corrugata Möllendorff, 1899
 Cathaica cucunorica Möllendorff, 1899
 Cathaica cunlunensis Möllendorff, 1899
 Cathaica dichrozona (E. von Martens, 1885)
 Cathaica fasciola (Draparnaud, 1801)
 Cathaica gansuica Möllendorff, 1899
 Cathaica holdereri Andreae, 1904
 Cathaica hookeri (Godwin-Austen, 1914)
 Cathaica iacosta Möllendorff, 1899
 Cathaica janulus Möllendorff, 1899
 † Cathaica kreitneri (Hilber, 1883) 
 Cathaica leei Yen, 1935
 Cathaica licenti Yen, 1935
 Cathaica mataianensis (G. Nevill, 1878)
 Cathaica mengi Yen, 1935
 Cathaica micangshanensis D. Chen & G. Zhang, 2004
 Cathaica mongolica (Möllendorff, 1881)
 Cathaica nanschanensis Möllendorff, 1899
 Cathaica nodulifera Möllendorff, 1899
 Cathaica obrutschewi Sturany, 1899
 Cathaica ochthephiloides Möllendorff, 1899
 Cathaica ohlmeri Andreae, 1904
 Cathaica orestias (Preston, 1912)
 Cathaica orithyia (Martens, 1879)
 Cathaica orithyiformis Yen, 1935
 Cathaica ottoi Pilsbry, 1934
 Cathaica pekinensis (Deshayes, 1874)
 Cathaica perversa Sturany, 1899
 Cathaica phaeozona (Martens, 1874)
 Cathaica polystigma Möllendorff, 1899
 Cathaica przewalskii (Martens, 1882)
 Cathaica pulveratricula (Martens, 1882)
 Cathaica pulveratrix (Martens, 1882)
 Cathaica radiata Pilsbry, 1934
 Cathaica richthofeni (Martens, 1873)
 Cathaica robertsi Yen, 1935
 Cathaica rossimontana Möllendorff, 1899
 Cathaica rugulosus D. Chen & G. Zhang, 2004
 Cathaica secusana (Gredler, 1892)
 Cathaica shikouensis Yen, 1935
 Cathaica siningfuensis (Hilber, 1882)
 Cathaica subrugosa (Deshayes, 1874)
 Cathaica teilhardi Yen, 1935
 Cathaica transitans Möllendorff, 1899
 Cathaica wangguanensis D. Chen & G. Zhang, 2004

References

 Andreae, A. (1900). Landschnecken aus Central- und Ostasien. Mittheilungen aus dem Roemer-Museum, Hildesheim. 12: 1-12.
 Bank, R. A. (2017). Classification of the Recent terrestrial Gastropoda of the World. Last update: July 16th, 2017

External links
 Möllendorff, O. F. von. (1884). Materialien zur Fauna von China. Jahrbücher der Deutschen Malakozoologischen Gesellschaft. 11: 162-181; 307-390

Camaenidae